Razvigor Yankov (born 10 April 1954) is a Bulgarian athlete. He competed in the men's decathlon at the 1980 Summer Olympics.

References

1954 births
Living people
Athletes (track and field) at the 1980 Summer Olympics
Bulgarian decathletes
Olympic athletes of Bulgaria
Sportspeople from Plovdiv